Helsinki Commission may mean:

The Baltic Marine Environment Protection Commission (HELCOM)
Commission on Security and Cooperation in Europe (U.S. Helsinki Commission)

See also 

Helsinki Committee for Human Rights (Helsinki Committee)